The Pakistan national football team represents Pakistan in men's international football in FIFA-authorized events and is controlled by the Pakistan Football Federation, the governing body for football in Pakistan. Pakistan became a member of FIFA in 1948 joining the Asian Football Confederation and its national team debuted in 1950.

Pakistan contests the South Asian Football Federation Championship and South Asian Games, which alternate biennially. Pakistan's football team has won gold at the South Asian Games in 1989, 1991, 2004 and 2006.

Pakistan has never qualified for any major tournament outside the South Asian region. Football has struggled to gain popularity in Pakistan largely due to the heavy influence of cricket in South Asia. As of 2020, Pakistan is the only team in Asia that has never won a FIFA World Cup qualifying game.

History

1950s – Pakistan's international debut
Pakistan made its international debut on a tour to Iran and Iraq in October 1950. Pakistan lost its first match 5–1 against Iran. Pakistan's next international outing came in the Colombo Cup where the team played its first match against India which ended in a goalless draw. During the 1950s, Pakistan played internationally in the following Colombo Cup editions which were played in India in 1954, then East Pakistan in 1955, and the Asian Games in Philippines in 1954 and in Japan in 1958.

Early 1960s and 1970s
In the early 1960s, Pakistan produced one of the finest players to ever grace the field in Pakistan Football History, Abdul Ghafoor  was nicknamed the "Pakistani Pele" and "Black Pearl of Pakistan". Ghafoor was part of Pakistan national football team setup when it was in the top 10 teams of Asia. According to The Express Tribune, he was "the last man alive from the days when the Pakistan football team was good enough to beat USSR, UAE and China – a far cry from the state of affairs right now."

It was three years before Pakistan played another competitive fixture, when they played in the first RDC Cup and finished third. In 1967, they played a series of friendlies against Saudi Arabia, all ending in draws. Later in the year Pakistan lost their Asian Cup qualifiers against Burma and Cambodia and drew their final match against India. They then hosted the second RDC Cup and finished third, which included the 4–7 defeat to Turkey. In 1969, they travelled to Iran to take part in a friendly tournament, in which they had a 2–1 win against Iraq and a record 7–0 defeat by Iran.

As a result of the 1971 Bangladesh Liberation War, East Pakistan became The People's Republic of Bangladesh and consequently the Pakistani team lost the right to call upon Bengali players. In the early 1970s the national side's participation was restricted to the RDC Cup and the 1974 Asian Games, and a single friendly against South Korea in 1978. The most notable result in this period was a 2–2 draw against Turkey.

1980–1990 (Rise and fall)

In the King's Cup in 1982, Pakistan secured a goalless draw against Indonesia, the team's first clean sheet since 1962. After a loss to Thailand, they gained a 3–2 victory versus Malaysia and although they lost a close game against China, they were able to win 1–0 in their final game against Singapore.

Pakistan hosted a friendly tournament involving Iran, Bangladesh, Oman and Nepal in 1982. The Green Shirts started off with a 2–1 win over Bangladesh. They then lost to Iran, but came back and beat Nepal 2–0. The last game against Oman ended nil-nil and Pakistan ended the tournament as runners-up. However, in 1984, the national team lost 4 out of 5 games in the Asian Cup qualifiers, the only victory coming against North Yemen 4–1.

The national team hosted another tournament in 1985, this time inviting North Korea, Indonesia, Bangladesh and Nepal. A goalless draw against the North Koreans boosted the side, and they beat Nepal 1–0. However, losses in the final two games against Bangladesh and Indonesia meant they were again runners up. In the South Asian Games, Pakistan ended fourth after losing a penalty shoot out to Nepal.

In the 1986 Asian Games, Pakistan lost all their games. However, a year later the side was more successful at the South Asian Games, winning the bronze medal match against Bangladesh 1–0. In 1988, they lost all their Asian Cup qualifiers. Pakistan made their first attempt to qualify for the World Cup in 1989. However, they were unable to win any of their matches. The national team bounced back, when several months later they took Gold at the South Asian Games, beating Bangladesh 1–0 in the final.

1990s–2003 (Decline)
Pakistan had another early exit in the Asian Games, losing all three games in 1990. In the 1991 South Asian Games, Pakistan beat the Maldives in the final 2–0 to win their second Gold.  Later in the year the first SAFF Cup took place, and the national team finished fourth, but at the 1993 South Asian Games, they were unable to get past the group stage.

In 1995, Pakistan went out of the SAFF Cup group stage on goal difference. Between 1996 and 1997, the team lost all their Asian Cup and World Cup qualifying games. Pakistan came third in the 1997 SAFF Cup, thanks to a 1–0 victory over Sri Lanka in the third place playoff. The 1999 SAFF Cup saw Pakistan finish bottom of their group, and Pakistan also failed to get out of the group stage of the final South Asian Games to hold full internationals.

Pakistan were unable to win any of their 2000 Asian Cup qualifiers. The following year Pakistan achieved their first point in World Cup qualification, thanks to a hat-trick by Gohar Zaman in a 3–3 draw against Sri Lanka, but all other matches ended in defeat.

In 2002, Pakistan played in an unsuccessful four match series against Sri Lanka. At the 2003 SAFF Cup, Pakistan finished fourth, losing 2–1 in extra time to India in the third place playoff. Later in the year, Pakistan won their first Asian Cup qualifier with a 3–0 over Macao, but still were unable to qualify. They rounded off the year with defeats to Kyrgyzstan in the World Cup qualifiers.

2004–2013 (New set-up and changes)
2004 saw changes in Pakistan football, with a new administration in place by this time and a new national league up and running. A victory against India in a three match series, the final match ending 3–0 to the Green Shirts, followed, and they went on the reach the semi-finals of the 2005 SAFF Cup. They lost the semifinal against defending champion Bangladesh by 0–1 margin.

The Pakistan team lost their first two Asian Cup qualifiers in 2006, in between which they took part in the first AFC Challenge Cup 2006. They failed to get past the group stage, but beat Kyrgyzstan 1–0. Back at the Asian Cup qualifiers, they lost their remaining fixtures. In the World Cup qualifiers in 2007, they fell to a heavy defeat by the Asian champions Iraq, losing 7–0 on aggregate across the two legs. In 2008, Pakistan travelled to Nepal for two friendlies before taking on the AFC Challenge Cup qualifiers. Although they won against Chinese Taipei 2–1 in the first match, and beat Guam in a record-equalling 9–2 win in the final match, other results, including a 7–1 defeat to Sri Lanka, saw them again fail to reach the finals.

In the SAFF Championship 2008, Pakistan failed to go beyond the group stages, losing to Maldives 3–0, India 2–1 and Nepal 4–1, which signalled the end of Akhtar Mohiuddin's tenure as head coach. After Mohiuddin's departure, Austrian-Hungarian coach George Kottan was hired and the veteran tactician took the team to the SAFF Championship 2009. Despite calling upon foreign players such as Adnan Ahmed, Shabir Khan, Amjad Iqbal, Atif Bashir and Reis Ashraf, the side were defeated 1–0 by Sri Lanka, before drawing 0–0 with Bangladesh as former Manchester United star Adnan missed a late penalty to seal a win. Pakistan won against Bhutan 7–0 in their last game.

Kottan was soon sacked in February 2010, Pakistan had no senior games during the entire calendar year but saw the appointment of Tottenham Hotspur legend Graham Roberts for the U-23 Team. For the AFC Challenge Cup 2012 qualifiers in 2011, KRL FC coach Tariq Lutfi was called up once more and failed to deliver emphatically. Defeats such as the 3–0 against Turkmenistan and 3–1 against India meant that the side were already out of the qualifiers despite beating Chinese Taipei by 2–0. Later in the 2014 FIFA World Cup Qualifiers in July, Bangladesh thoroughly beat Pakistan 3–0 in Dhaka, before earning a 0–0 draw in Lahore a few days later.

That saw the end of Lutfi's reign, with Serbian boss Zaviša Milosavljević taking over in November 2011 right before the SAFF Championship 2011. Despite having little time to influence the team, Zavisa managed to hold Bangladesh 0–0, Maldives 0–0 and Nepal 1–1 in the India-hosted SAFF Championship 2011. However, they were unable to progress into the semi-finals and returned home.

2012's sole game was witnessed in November against Singapore, who thrashed Pakistan 4–0 at home. Pakistan started 2013 well, winning two games against Nepal with identical 1–0 margins thanks to the brilliance of Hassan Bashir. A 1–1 draw with Maldives followed, but with congested fixtures Pakistan ended up losing the last game 3–0 in Male.

2013–2017

Pakistan then played the 2014 AFC Challenge Cup qualification in Bishkek, losing out 1–0 to Tajikistan in injury-time. Pakistan also lost 1–0 against the Kyrgyzstan after scoring in the 1st minute, but with Hassan Bashir and returning Kaleemullah Pakistan comfortably beat Macau 2–0.

Pakistan played a friendly against Afghanistan in August, losing 3–0 emphatically without their foreign-based players. Coach Zaviša Milosavljević was sacked and replaced by Bahrain's Mohammad Al-Shamlan, who acted as a coaching consultant to Shahzad Anwar in the 2013 SAFF Championship

The Shaheens lost their first game 1–0 to India after an own-goal from Samar Ishaq. Against hosts Nepal, Hassan Bashir scored an early goal, only to see 15-year-old Bimal Gharti Magar level things in injury-time. However, Pakistan beat Bangladesh 2–1 but failed to advance to the semi-finals.

Pakistan did not qualify for the 2014 FIFA World Cup, being eliminated by Bangladesh in the first round of the AFC qualifying section, losing  3–0 on aggregate.

In 2014, Pakistan played a 2 match friendly series with India. Both matches were played at Bangalore Stadium in India. India beat Pakistan 1–0 in the first friendly, leading the series, but Pakistan won the second match 0–2.

For Pakistan's campaign for the 2018 FIFA World Cup, they were to face Yemen in Round 1 in the AFC qualifying section. In the first match, Pakistan lost 3–1. For the second match, Pakistan drew 0–0, eliminating Pakistan from the tournament on aggregate.

2017 FIFA Suspension

Pakistan was suspended from all football activities by FIFA on 10 October 2017.

Post Suspension (2018–2020)

FIFA restored membership of PFF on 13 March 2018. With Asian Games approaching in August and SAFF Cup in September, Pakistan football team had very little time to prepare. PFF announced the signing of new Brazilian coach José Antonio Nogueira and started camps in Lahore. The team played friendlies in Bahrain with their premier clubs from mid of July till end of it. Pakistan lost 1, drew 1 and won 2 matches in Bahrain. Then, Pakistan national under-23 football team along with 3 senior players flew to Indonesia in mid August to take part in Asian Games. On 14 August 2018, the team played its first group game against Vietnam, the then runner ups of 2018 AFC U-23 Championship which resulted in a 3–0 loss. On 16 August 2018, the team faced a loss against Japan by a scoreline of 4–0. Pakistan defeated Nepal by 2–1 in their final group game which was the former's first win in Asian Games after 44 years. Pakistan expected to qualify for knockouts being 3rd in the group. However, the team fell short in terms of Goal Difference.

Pakistan senior team went to Bangladesh to take part in SAFF Cup which started in September, 2018 which was their first FIFA recognized tournament after a span of 3 years. Pakistani descent footballer Adnan Mohammad wasn't issued visa by Bengali authorities to participate in the competition. Pakistan played its first match of the event against Nepal (40 ranks higher than the former then) on 4 September 2018 which ended in a 2–1 win. This match also included Muhammad Ali's late stoppage time header to claim the winner as Pakistan got 3 crucial points. Pakistan lost its next match to hosts Bangladesh on 6 September 2018 by 1–0 after conceding a late goal. Green shirts played their final group game against Bhutan on 8 September 2018 which ended in a 3–0 win and sealed their place in semis after 13 years. Pakistan faced arch rivals India in semi final on 12 September 2018 and were ultimately knocked out by 3–1. After first half being goalless, Manvir Singh's brace and Summit Passi's header allowed the Blues to go 3–0 ahead. Hassan Bashir late consolation goal decreased the margin by 1 goal. 
Star footballer Kaleemullah Khan wasn't a part of these events due to his disputes with PFF authorities.

After SAFF Cup, Pakistan negotiated with Palestine Football Association for a friendly. It was initially reported that the match will be played in Lahore, Pakistan on 15 November 2018 but Palestine decided to host the event afterwards. Due to visa issues, Pakistan team couldn't fly to Palestine on the desired date. So, the match was played on 16 November in which Shaheens lost by 2–1. Hassan Bashir scored the only goal for Pakistan in first 30 minutes which was assisted by debutant Adnan Mohammad.

Disappointment would soon strike again as Pakistan missed out the 2022 FIFA World Cup and 2023 AFC Asian Cup at the same time, when Pakistan lost to Cambodia twice in the first round and was eliminated.

2021–2022 FIFA Suspension

Pakistan were once again suspended from all football activities by FIFA on 7 April 2021. The suspension was lifted on 29 June 2022.

Team image

Stadiums

For the first fifty years of their existence, Pakistan played their home matches all around the country. They initially used cricket grounds before later moving on to football stadiums. Pakistan played at a number of different venues across the country, though by the year 2003, this had largely settled down to having the Punjab Stadium in Lahore as the primary venue, with Islamabad's Jinnah Sports Stadium and Karachi's People's Football Stadium used on occasions where the Punjab Stadium was unavailable for home matches.

The Pakistan Football Federation has its headquarters near Punjab stadium, which hosted most of the matches for the AFC President's Cup 2007. Muhammad Essa was the first player to score an international goal at this venue, against India in June 2005.

The Jinnah Sports Stadium is the largest football stadium in Pakistan with a capacity of over 45,000, whereas the People's Football Stadium is second largest with 40,000.

Kit
The Pakistan national team's home kit has always been a green shirt and white shorts. The colours are derived from the flag of Pakistan which is a green field with a white crescent moon and five-rayed star at its centre, and a vertical white stripe at the hoist side. The away shirt colour has changed several times. The national team has used white shirt with white shorts or white shirt with green shorts. Historically, white shirt with green shorts is the most often used colour combination. The kits are currently manufactured by Forward Sports. Forward Sports is the official provider of balls for FIFA World Cup 2014 and FIFA World Cup 2018, the company came into prominence for landing the contract of over 3,000 "Brazuca" balls that were used at the FIFA World Cup 2014 in Brazil. Bloomberg and BBC are among many news agencies that have covered the company.

Kit suppliers

Rivalries

Pakistan's arch-rivals are India. Pakistan has won three games, there have been seven draws and fifteen wins for India among the 25 games played so far. Pakistan also share rivalries with Bangladesh (1 win, 5 draws and 7 defeats) and Afghanistan (3 wins, 0 draws and 1 defeat).

Results and fixtures
For all past match results of the national team, see the team's results page.

2022

2023

Coaching staff

Current personnel

Coaching history

  George Ainsley (1959–1962)
  Sheikh Shaheb Ali (1960, caretaker)
  Bert Trautmann (1980–1983)
  Burkhard Ziese (1987–1990)
 Various (1990–2000)
  Dave Burns (2000–2001)
  John Layton (2001–2002)
  Joseph Herel (2002–2003)
  Wang Xiaohe (2003–2004)
  Tariq Lutfi (2004–2005)
  Salman Sharida (2005–2007)
  Akhtar Mohiuddin (2007–2008)
  Shahzad Anwar (2008, caretaker)
  György Kottán (2009–2010)
  Graham Roberts (2010–2011)
  Tariq Lutfi (2011, caretaker)
  Zaviša Milosavljević (2011–2013)
  Shahzad Anwar (2013, caretaker)
  Mohammad Al-Shamlan (2013–2015)
  Shahzad Anwar (2015–2017)
  José Antonio Nogueira (2018–2019)
  Tariq Lutfi (2019–2021)
  Shahzad Anwar (2022–present)

Players

Current squad
The following 23 players were called up for the Friendly matches against Nepal on 16 November 2022.

Caps and goals are correct 16 November 2022, after the match against Nepal.

{{nat fs g player|no=|pos=FW|name=Waleed Khan|age='18'Unknown|caps=1|goals=0|club=Popo FC|clubnat=PAK}}

Recent call-ups
The following players have also been called up to the Pakistan squad within the last twelve months.

Player recordsPlayers in bold are still active with Pakistan.Most appearances

Top goalscorers

Competitive record
FIFA World Cup

AFC Asian Cup

AFC Challenge Cup

The AFC Challenge Cup was held every two years from 2006 through 2014.

Asian GamesFootball at the Asian Games has been an under-23 tournament since 2002.SAFF Championship

ECO Cup

FIFA World Ranking

Source:www.fifa.com''

Head-to-head record

Last match updated :     on 16 November 2022

Honours and recognition

Regional
South Asian Games
Champions (4): 1989, 1991, 2004, 2006
Runners-Up (1): 1987
SAFF Championship
Third Place (1): 1997
Semi Finalist (4): 1993, 2003, 2005, 2018
RCD/ECO Cup
Third Place (5): 1965, 1967, 1969, 1970, 1974

Friendly
Colombo Cup
Champions (1): 1952
Runners-Up (2): 1953, 1955
Third-place (1): 1954
Merdeka Cup
Runners-Up (1): 1962
Fourth Place (1): 1960
Philippine Peace Cup
Third Place (1): 2013

See also
 Pakistan national under-23 football team
 Pakistan national under-20 football team
 Pakistan national under-17 football team
 Pakistan Football Federation

Notes

References

External links
 Pakistani Football Association
 Pakistan FIFA profile
 FPDC

 
Asian national association football teams
National sports teams established in 1950